The 2008 Skyrunner World Series was the 7th edition of the global skyrunning competition, Skyrunner World Series, organised by the International Skyrunning Federation from 2002. 

From this year and up to 2011 (4 editions) was introduced Skyrunner World Series Trials.

Skyrunner World Series Races
The World Cup has developed in 6 races from May to September. in addition at the 8 trials.

Skyrunner World Series Trials
8 races in calendar.

Final rankings

Men
1st  Kilian Jornet (Salomon Santiveri) 500 points
2nd  Jessed Hernández (FEEC)	422 points
3rd  Agustí Roc (Salomon Santiveri)	414 points

Women
1st  Corinne Favre (FEEC)	476 points
2nd  Angela Mudge	444 points
3rd  Rosa Madureira (Selección portuguesa) 432 points
4th  Stephanie Jiménez (Salomon Santiveri-Selecció Andorrana) 412 points

References

External links
 Skyrunner World Series

2008